Kissya Cataldo da Costa is a Brazilian rower. In 2012 she tested positive for the drug EPO and was thrown out of the 2012 Summer Olympic Games in London. She won 2014–2015 Brazilian Rowing Championship w1x class.

Cataldo-Da Costa tested positive second time in 2015 by WADA just before Panamerican Games in 2015. She was banned for 4 years.

References

 

Brazilian female rowers
Living people
Rowers at the 2012 Summer Olympics
Olympic rowers of Brazil
Year of birth missing (living people)
Doping cases in rowing